Frances Tiafoe was the defending champion but chose not to defend his title.

Blaž Kavčič won the title after defeating Peter Polansky 6–3, 2–6, 7–5 in the final.

Seeds

Draw

Finals

Top half

Bottom half

References
Main Draw
Qualifying Draw

Challenger Banque Nationale de Granby
Challenger de Granby